Crap Attack is compilation album by American rock band We Are Scientists, released on November 6, 2006 in the UK. The album is a compilation of b-sides and rarities. It contains covers of "Hoppípolla" by Icelandic band Sigur Rós, "Bang Bang Rock & Roll" by British band Art Brut, "Be My Baby" by 1960s girl group The Ronettes and "Sie hat was vermisst"  by Bela B. and remixes of their own songs from With Love and Squalor.

The album also contains a DVD with a video to every song on the album. It also contains a live show which was filmed at Shepherd's Bush Empire on 13 April 2006 in London, as well as two promotional adverts for With Love and Squalor.

Track listing

Notes
 Under The Sea versions are acoustic versions

External links
 Official website
 What's The Word

We Are Scientists albums
2006 compilation albums
B-side compilation albums